Sanjala sam naše venčanje (English: I Had a Dream About Our Wedding) is the first studio album by Serbian singer Dragana Mirković. It was released in 1984.

Track listing
Imam dečka nemirnog
Uteši me, tužna sam
Znam da nosim prsten tvoj
Haljinica plave boje
Kača
Hej mladiću, baš si šik
Sanjala sam naše venčanje
Proleće je, samo meni nije
Tebi treba žena kao ja

References

1984 albums
Dragana Mirković albums